MMO may refer to:

Entertainment
 Massively multiplayer online game, a video game that can be played by many people simultaneously
 Music Minus One, a record company in Westchester, New York

Science and technology
 Methane monooxygenase, an enzyme
 Mach Maximum Operating (MMO), a speed limit shown on a machmeter
 Marvel Mystery Oil, used as a fuel additive
 Mercury Magnetospheric Orbiter, a component of the Mercury mapper BepiColombo
 Mini-Mag Orion, a proposed type of spacecraft propulsion
 Mixed metal oxide, a type of electrode

Other
 Means, motive, and opportunity, three aspects of a crime
 Minimum municipal obligation, minimum contribution to a pension plan
 Maio Airport, in Cape Verde, IATA code
 Melton Mowbray railway station, England (National Rail station code MMO)
 Marine Management Organisation, UK government body
 Marine mammal observer, a professional in environmental consulting
 Met Moeite Opgericht, a soccer club in Hoogmade, the Netherlands

See also
 Military Merit Order (disambiguation)